Maksim Nikolayevich Ryazantsev (born 14 March 1977) is a former Russian professional footballer.

Club career
He made his professional debut in the Russian Third League in 1995 for FC Vympel Rybinsk.

He played 6 seasons in the Russian Football National League for FC Ural Sverdlovsk Oblast.

References

1977 births
People from Rybinsk
Living people
Russian footballers
Association football midfielders
FC Oryol players
FC Khimik-Arsenal players
FC Ural Yekaterinburg players
Siberian Academy of Physical Culture alumni
FC Arsenal Tula players
FC Dynamo Vologda players
FC Znamya Truda Orekhovo-Zuyevo players
Sportspeople from Yaroslavl Oblast